Uma Shankar Singh (17 January 1940 – 24 January 2013) was an Indian politician. He was a member of the Indian Parliament and represented Maharajganj (Bihar) (Lok Sabha constituency).  
On 18 January 2013, he was admitted at the All India Institutes of Medical Sciences in New Delhi for treatment of cold, pneumonia and chest congestion. He never recovered and died from a lung infection on 24 January.

References

1940 births
2013 deaths
India MPs 2009–2014
Deaths from lung disease
Lok Sabha members from Bihar
Rashtriya Janata Dal politicians
Janata Dal (United) politicians